1933 in philosophy

Events

Publications 
 John Cowper Powys, A Philosophy of Solitude  (1933)

Births 
 January 16 - Susan Sontag (died 2004)
 January 17 - Liu Gangji (died 2019)
 August 1 - Antonio Negri

Deaths 
 April 29 - Constantine P. Cavafy (born 1863)
 August 31 - Theodor Lessing (born 1872)
 October 15 - Nitobe Inazō (born 1862)
 December 18 - Hans Vaihinger (born 1852)

References 

Philosophy
20th-century philosophy
Philosophy by year